Cefoperazone is a third-generation cephalosporin antibiotic, marketed by Pfizer under the name Cefobid. It is one of few cephalosporin antibiotics effective in treating Pseudomonas bacterial infections which are otherwise resistant to these antibiotics.

It was patented in 1974 and approved for medical use in 1981. Cefoperazone/sulbactam (Sulperazon) is a co-formulation with sulbactam.

Spectrum of bacterial susceptibility
Cefoperazone has a broad spectrum of activity and has been used to target bacteria responsible for causing infections of the respiratory and urinary tract, skin, and the female genital tract. The following represents MIC susceptibility data for a few medically significant microorganisms.
 Haemophilus influenzae: 0.12 - 0.25 µg/ml
 Staphylococcus aureus: 0.125 - 32 µg/ml
 Streptococcus pneumoniae: ≤0.007 - 1 µg/ml

Adverse effects
Cefoperazone contains an N-methylthiotetrazole (NMTT or 1-MTT) side chain. As the antibiotic is broken down in the body, it releases free NMTT, which can cause hypoprothrombinemia (likely due to inhibition of the enzyme vitamin K epoxide reductase) and a reaction with ethanol similar to that produced by disulfiram (Antabuse), due to inhibition of aldehyde dehydrogenase.

Mechanism of action
Cefoperazone exerts its bactericidal effect by inhibiting the bacterial cell wall synthesis, and sulbactam acts as a beta-lactamase inhibitor, to increase the antibacterial activity of cefoperazone against beta-lactamase-producing organisms.

References

Acetaldehyde dehydrogenase inhibitors
Cephalosporin antibiotics
Tetrazoles
Piperazines
Phenols
Acetamides
Lactams
Pfizer brands